The Mystery Road is a 1921 British silent drama film directed by Paul Powell. Alfred Hitchcock is credited as a title designer. The film is considered to be lost.

Cast
 David Powell as Gerald Dombey
 Nadja Ostrovska as Myrtile Sargot
 Pardoe Woodman as Christopher Went
 Mary Glynne as Lady Susan Farrington
 Ruby Miller as Vera Lypashi
 Percy Standing as Luigi
 Lewis Gilbert as Jean Sargot
 Irene Tripod as Widow Dumesnel
 Lionel d'Aragon as Pierre Naval
 Arthur M. Cullin as Earl of Farrington
 Judd Green as The Vagabond

See also
 Alfred Hitchcock filmography

References

External links

1921 films
1921 drama films
1921 lost films
Lost British films
British drama films
British silent feature films
British black-and-white films
Films directed by Paul Powell (director)
Lost drama films
1920s British films
Silent drama films
Paramount Pictures films
Islington Studios films